WWSP (89.9 FM) is a student-operated radio station broadcasting from Stevens Point, Wisconsin. The station is owned by the Board of Regents of the University of Wisconsin System. Broadcasting an alternative format, it features locally sourced programming augmented by AP Radio.

Each April the station hosts a trivia contest run by local radio personality Jim "Oz" Oliva and John Eckendorf. It serves as a fundraiser for the station and the college. Billing itself as "The World's Largest Trivia Contest," the contest regularly draws 12,000 players with local participants from Portage County and other counties such as Wood and Marathon. Distant teams and displaced members of local teams can also participate remotely through the station's webcast.

In 2019, the governor of Wisconsin, Tony Evers, declared the second weekend of April "Trivia Weekend".

References

External links

The World's Largest Trivia Contest

WSP
Radio stations in Wisconsin
University of Wisconsin–Stevens Point